Imre Vígh (3 April 1938 – 23 April 2001) was a Hungarian wrestler. He competed in the men's freestyle light heavyweight at the 1964 Summer Olympics.

References

External links
 
 
 
 

1938 births
2001 deaths
Hungarian male sport wrestlers
Olympic wrestlers of Hungary
Wrestlers at the 1964 Summer Olympics
Sportspeople from Székesfehérvár